Universidad Nacional Experimental Simón Rodríguez is a university in Caracas founded in 1974.

Universities and colleges in Caracas
Educational institutions established in 1974
1974 establishments in Venezuela